Visa requirements for Transnistrian citizens are administrative entry restrictions by the authorities of other states placed on citizens of the Transnistria.

Validity 

As Transnistria is not recognised by the majority of nations of the world (with the exceptions of Abkhazia, South Ossetia and Artsakh, all of which are also mostly unrecognised), a Transnistrian passport is not valid for travel to most countries in the world. Dual nationality is permitted. Most citizens are entitled to either a Moldovan, Russian or Ukrainian passport for travel abroad.

Transnistrian passport can only be used to travel to Abkhazia with visa and without visas to South Ossetia and Artsakh.

See also
Visa policy of Transnistria
Transnistrian passport

References and Notes
References

Notes

Transnistria
Foreign relations of Transnistria